Nasim Fekrat is an Afghanistani journalist and blogger who worked for various media outlets. He is a two-time winner of the freedom of expression awards; in 2005 from France Reporters Sans Frontieres (RWB) and in 2008 from ISF (Information Safety and Freedom) in Siena, Italy. He is the editor of the Afghan Lord blog as well as directing the Association of Afghan Blog Writers (AABW). Fekrat's work has appeared on BBC Persian, CNN, Foreign Policy Magazine, his own news sites, and publications run by both NATO and the United Nations. As the leader of a small movement of young journalists, he advocates for a free press in Afghanistan.

References

External links
 The World Through My Eyes - Photography
 Afghan Lord- Blog 
 Notes from Kabul یادداشت هایی از کابل 

Afghan journalists
Afghan bloggers
Living people
Year of birth missing (living people)
21st-century journalists
Male journalists